Naas (or  ) is the county town of County Kildare in Ireland. In 2016, it had a population of 21,393, making it the second-largest town in County Kildare after Newbridge.

History

In the Middle Ages, Naas became a walled market town and was occasionally raided by the O'Byrne and O'Toole clans from the nearby area which became County Wicklow. To guard against this danger, town walls were built in around 1415. Naas features on the 1598 map by Abraham Ortelius as Nosse.

A mayor and council were selected by local merchants and landowners. Naas became known as the "county town" of County Kildare because of its use as a place for trading, public meetings, local administration including law courts, racecourses and the army's Devoy Barracks (closed 1998). In the Middle Ages, before it settled permanently in Dublin, the Parliament of Ireland occasionally met in Naas, as in 1441.

Saint David's Castle, a 13th-century Norman castle, was first built c. 1210, although the present structure is a fortified house of the 18th century.

One of the first battles of the rebellion of 1798 took place in Naas on 24 May 1798. During the Battle of Naas, a force of about 1,000 rebels was defeated in an unsuccessful attack on the town.

In 1898, the Local Government Act established Naas Urban District Council (later called Naas Town Council). Naas Town Council was abolished in June 2014, when the Local Government Reform Act 2014 dissolved town councils and designated Kildare County Council as the administrative local authority for the entire county.

Amenities

Naas has a hospital Naas General Hospital, Naas Racecourse, Mondello Park International Motor Racing Circuit, a library, the 200-seat Moat Theatre, five-screen 3D Odeon cinema, RSA driving test centre, a tax office, a district court, local authority offices, five supermarkets, several pubs, and a number of schools, hotels and nightclubs.

Economy
Local industrial enterprises include Kerry Group's Global Technology and Innovation Centre, and International Fund Services (a State Street company).

The town centre of Naas includes shops, restaurants, nightclubs, boutiques and shops. Other retail outlets have been developed in new retail parks and shopping centres on the outskirts of the town.

A shopping centre on Monread Road was completed in 2010 with Ireland's largest Tesco Superstore as the anchor tenant. Other retail parks serve the town on both ends - northern and southern - with outlets such as Harvey Norman, PC World, B&Q, Smyths Toys, and Halfords.

The Naas/Sallins area is served by two Aldi supermarkets, two Lidl stores, two Supervalu supermarkets, a Tesco Extra supermarket, a smaller Tesco Metro in the town centre, and (as of August 2019) a new Dunnes Stores food hall. Danish home retail group JYSK, a competitor for Sweden's IKEA, opened their first Irish store Newhall Retail Park in Naas during April 2019. Several smaller foodstores are scattered around the town.

Aldi has a distribution centre in Jigginstown, Naas.

Religion
The town has two Roman Catholic churches, one Church of Ireland church, and one Presbyterian church. The original parish church, St David's Church, is Church of Ireland. The Roman Catholic parish church, the Church of Our Lady and St. David, dates from 1827. The Augustinian Friary was founded in the late 14th century.  In 1997, the second Catholic Church opened in Ballycane on the east side of town and is dedicated to the Irish Martyrs. Naas is part of the Diocese of Kildare and Leighlin which is run by Bishop Denis Nulty since August 4, 2013. Naas Presbyterian Church was built in the Victorian period on the site of the old tholsel. Maudlin's Cemetery, a Church of Ireland graveyard near the town, is noted for its two Victorian-era pyramids.

Media
County Kildare's local radio station Kfm 97.3FM – 97.6FM is based in Naas. The Leinster Leader, a regional newspaper, and Kildare TV, a local station, are also based in the area.

Transport

The nearby N7 Naas Road connects Naas with Dublin and the M50 motorway (Ireland). Additionally, the M7 Motorway connects Naas with the South and South West.

Naas railway station, which opened on 22 June 1855, closed for passenger traffic on 27 January 1947 to be re-purposed for goods trains. It reopened on 10 March 1947, but was closed 12 years later on 1 April 1959. The Sallins and Naas railway station, located in nearby Sallins, is used by residents of the Naas area who commute to Dublin.

The main bus transportation companies serving the area are Go-Ahead Ireland , JJ Kavanagh and Sons and Dublin Coach. Naas's main bus routes include the Go-Ahead Ireland route 126  from Kildare to Dublin city centre (which passes through Naas), a JJ Kavanagh route to Blanchardstown, and Dublin Coach and JJ Kavanagh services to Dublin Airport.

The N7 Naas Road was upgraded in 2006 to a six-lane carriageway with grade-separated interchanges. As of April 2021, Junction 9a of the M7, a new junction for Clane, Millennium Park, and the Sallins Bypass, has been completed and is now open for public use.

 M7 Motorway – Connects Naas with Limerick, as well as Cork (via M8) and Waterford (via M9)
 N7 (R448 N From Monread Boulevard to Maudlins Interchange) – Connects Naas with Dublin.
 R410 – Connects Naas with Blessington
 R411 – Connects Naas with Ballymore Eustace
 R448 – Connects Naas with Kilcullen
 R445 – Connects Naas with Newbridge
 R409 – Connects Naas with Caragh
 R407 – Connects Naas with Sallins, Maynooth, Clane and Celbridge.
 (South Outer Ring) – Connects Limerick Road at Primrose (West Naas) with Blessington Road at Mountain View (East Naas)
 (Millennium Blvd Ring Road) – Connects Limerick Road at Newhall Interchange M7 with Monread Road at Millennium Roundabout

Education
Naas has several primary schools, including the Convent of Mercy (a girls' school), St. Corban's Boys National School (a school for boys), Ballycane, and St. David's (each mixed schools),  (located at the Piper's Hill campus), Kilashee National School and Naas Community National School is located at Cradockstown.

Naas has a public library which is located in the canal harbour area. With plans to move to the town centre.

Sport and leisure

The Moat Theatre is a 200-seat performance and visual arts centre in Naas, which hosts local and national stage productions, live music and other events.

The local Gaelic Athletic Association club is Naas GAA, and the club has won several senior county football and hurling championships.

Local association football (soccer) clubs include Naas AFC Soccer Club, Redwood Naas FC, Monread FC Soccer Club, and Naas United FC Soccer Club, several of which play in the Kildare and District Football League.

Other sports clubs include Naas Rugby Club, Naas Hockey Club, Naas Cycling Club, Naas Panthers Gymnastics Academy, Naas Lawn Tennis Club (with 11 courts) and Naas Athletic Club on the Caragh Road.

Naas Golf Club, one of three local golf clubs, is actually located in Sallins.

There are several equestrian facilities in the area, with Naas Racecourse (about 1 km from the town centre), and Punchestown Racecourse (just to the south-west of the town at Eadestown). Osborne Stables is also based at Craddockstown, Naas. The annual Punchestown Race Festival is a major event for a full week in April. The Oxegen music festival was held at Punchestown during the summer for a number of years but has not been rescheduled since it was cancelled in 2014.

There are also a number of swimming pools and leisure centres in the area.

People
 Gormflaith ingen Murchada (c.960–1030), third wife of Brian Ború
 Mother Teresa Ellen Dease (1820–1889), foundress of the Institute of the Blessed Virgin Mary (Loretto Sisters) in North America (at Toronto)
 Major Leonard Greenham Star Molloy (1861–1937), Harley Street doctor and politician
 Thomas Burgh (1670–1730), architect and Member of Parliament for Naas
 Hubert de Burgh (1879–1960), cricketer
John Lyons (1824–1867), a Victoria Cross recipient, was originally from Carlow and died at Naas in 1867
 Michael Roe (b.1955), racing driver
 James Roe Jr. (b. 1998), racing driver
 Larry Tompkins, (b.1963), Gaelic football manager
 Andrew Strong (b.1973), singer and actor, famous for his role in The Commitments, was brought up in Naas
 Geordan Murphy (b.1978), rugby union player, Ireland and Leicester Tigers
 Jamie Heaslip (b.1983), rugby union player, Ireland, Naas and Leinster
 Joseph Bourke (c.1740–1794), 3rd Earl of Mayo
 Sir John de Robeck (1862–1928), Admiral of the Fleet, Royal Navy, 1925-1928
 Jenny McCudden, journalist and television producer
 Marian Finucane (1950 - 2020), radio presenter and television host, lived in Naas

Twinning

Naas is twinned with the following places:

   Allaire, Brittany, France
    Casalattico, Lazio region, Italy
   Dillingen an der Donau, Bavaria, Germany
    Omaha, Nebraska, United States
   St David's, Pembrokeshire, Wales, United Kingdom

See also
 List of abbeys and priories in Ireland (County Kildare)
 List of towns and villages in Ireland
 Earl of Mayo

References

Sources

 Nolan W. & McGrath T. (eds.) Kildare History and Society (Geography, Dublin 2006)

External links

 Official Naas website
 Naas Local History Group
 Naas community website

 
County towns in the Republic of Ireland